Bengt-Olle Jonny Jönsson (born 1 December 1955) is a Swedish singer, songwriter and musician. He is best known as the lead vocalist and primary lyricist of the dansband Lasse Stefanz. Earlier, he was also drummer, until a wrist operation. In January 2007, Gunnar Nilsson became the band's drummer instead.

In November 2012, Olle Jönsson announced he would immediately leave the band. But in the upcoming week, he reappeared on stage as the band's singer. He is a founding member of Lasse Stefanz.

Citations

External links 
 
 http://www.grammis.se/?page=62 Grammis awards of 1989

1955 births
Living people
Jonsson, Olle
Jonsson, Olle
Jonsson, Olle
Melodifestivalen contestants of 2011